Peter David Mulgrew  (21 November 1927 – 28 November 1979) was a New Zealand mountaineer, yachtsman and businessman.

Life and career 
Mulgrew was born in Lower Hutt to boilermaker William John Mulgrew and woollen industry worker Edith Mulgrew (née Matthews). He attended the Hutt Valley Memorial Technical College. He served in the Royal New Zealand Navy for eleven years, including service on a frigate in the Korean War. On 20 September 1952, in Wellington, he married June Martha Anderson. They had two daughters, Robyn and Susan.

Mulgrew had to be carried part-way by a Sherpa (Urkien). He was an "appalling sight" and "it was a miracle he was still alive". A helicopter took him from the Barun Valley to Shanta Bhawan Hospitlal in Khatmandu. Hillary was horrified when he saw him and got his wife June to fly to Nepal. In New Zealand both frostbitten feet were amputated.

Later he went on a 1964 Himalayan schoolhouse expedition, and a 1966 Himalayan hospital expedition. He also climbed in the Swiss Alps, ascending the Matterhorn.

In the 1958 Queen's Birthday Honours, he was awarded the British Empire Medal.

He represented New Zealand in the world One Ton yachting championships in Sydney in 1972 and sailed around Cape Horn the next year.

He was group general manager of Alex Harvey Industries, Auckland and served on the boards of AHI Aluminium and elsewhere. Outside of commerce, he was a member of the Himalayan Trust Board and the Spirit of Adventure Trust Board.

Death 
Mulgrew was killed in the crash of Air New Zealand Flight 901 at Mount Erebus on a sightseeing flight to Antarctica, in which all 257 on board died. He was a commentator on the flight, having replaced his close friend Sir Edmund Hillary, who was on a scheduled speaking tour of the United States. In 1989 his widow, June, married Hillary.

Honorific eponym
The Mulgrew Nunatak in Antarctica is named in Mulgrew's honour.

Works
No Place for Men (Reed, Wellington, 1964, also 1965, 1975)
I Hold the Heights (Doubleday, New York, 1965)
Gentleman’s Magellan: A voyage of re-discovery around Cape Horn  from notes by Peter Mulgrew, Ken Mulgrew's log and Wally Romanes' diary; edited by Bruce Harvey (Morris-Cobb, Auckland, 1974)

References

Further reading
Evening Post, 28 November 1979 (Obituary)
 
 
 Story: Mulgrew, Peter David

1927 births
1979 deaths
New Zealand male sailors (sport)
New Zealand mountain climbers
20th-century New Zealand businesspeople
Royal New Zealand Navy personnel
New Zealand military personnel of the Korean War
Sportspeople from Lower Hutt
New Zealand amputees
New Zealand and the Antarctic
New Zealand recipients of the British Empire Medal
Victims of aviation accidents or incidents in Antarctica
Victims of aviation accidents or incidents in 1979
Edmund Hillary